Ferenc Ilyés (born 20 December 1981) is a retired Hungarian handball player.

Career

Club
Born in Odorheiu Secuiesc into an ethnic Hungarian family, Ilyés started to play handball for his hometown club. He was spotted by the scouts of SC Pick Szeged, and the talented left back signed a contract with the Tisza-side team in 2000. His playing minutes were limited in the early times, so he moved to Makói KC on loan to get more experience. He returned to Szeged as a more mature player and immediately became a regular team member.He played in Szeged until 2007, when he switched to domestic rivals MKB Veszprém KC. With them he has won the EHF Cup Winners' Cup in 2008. After his contract ran out in 2009, he moved to Bundesliga outfit TBV Lemgo on a two-year deal. He took the EHF Cup title with the German team in 2010, after beating Kadetten Schaffhausen in the finals.
On 14 January 2011 it was announced that Ilyés signed a three-year contract with his former club, Veszprém, and will re-join the record champions in the summer. However, a year later he was certified for the Polish team Wisła Płock. From the 2013/14 season, he played again in the colors of SC Pick Szeged, with which he won the EHF Cup in 2014. Joined the Grundfos Tatabánya KC in the summer of 2016. He retired from Grundfos Tatabánya KC in the summer of 2021 and became manager of the club. Grundfos Tatabánya KC retired the 18th field number of Ilyés.

International
He made his debut in the Hungarian national team on 27 December 2003 against the Czech Republic. His first major tournament was the 2004 European Championship in Slovenia. He participated on another five European Championships (2006, 2008, 2010, 2012, 2014) and was also present on four World Championships (2007, 2009, 2011, 2019). His best result on international level is a fourth place, which he achieved at the 2004 Summer Olympics and at the 2012 Summer Olympics. He was the captain of national team between 2011 and 2019.

Personal life 
Her sister is the former handball player Annamária Ilyés.

Honours

Club
Pick Szeged
EHF Cup
 : 2014
Nemzeti Bajnokság I
 : 2007
 : 2002, 2003, 2004, 2005, 2006, 2014, 2015, 2016
 : 2001
Magyar Kupa
 : 2006
 : 2002, 2003, 2004, 2005, 2014, 2015, 2016

MKB Veszprém KC
EHF Cup Winners' Cup
 : 2008
EHF Champions Trophy
 : 2008
Nemzeti Bajnokság I
 : 2008, 2009, 2012
Magyar Kupa
 : 2009, 2012
 : 2008

TBV Lemgo
EHF Cup
 : 2010

Wisła Płock
Superliga
 : 2013
Polish Cup
 : 2013

Grundfos Tatabánya KC
Nemzeti Bajnokság I
: 2017, 2018, 2019, 2021
Magyar Kupa
 : 2017

Individual
  Golden Cross of the Cross of Merit of the Republic of Hungary (2012)
 Hungarian Best Defensive Player Of The Year: 2008, 2010, 2011, 2014, 2018

References

External links

Ferenc Ilyés player profile on MKB Veszprém official website
Ferenc Ilyés career statistics at Worldhandball 

1981 births
Living people
People from Odorheiu Secuiesc
Hungarian male handball players
Olympic handball players of Hungary
Handball players at the 2004 Summer Olympics
Handball players at the 2012 Summer Olympics
Székely people
SC Pick Szeged players
Expatriate handball players in Poland
Hungarian expatriate sportspeople in Germany
Hungarian expatriate sportspeople in Poland
Handball-Bundesliga players
Veszprém KC players
Wisła Płock (handball) players